Marssac-sur-Tarn (literally Marssac on Tarn) is a commune in the Tarn department in southern France.

Transport
Marssac-sur-Tarn station has rail connections to Toulouse, Albi and Rodez.

See also
Communes of the Tarn department

References

Communes of Tarn (department)